U.S. Route 278 (US 278), mostly internally designated by the Alabama Department of Transportation as State Route 74 (SR 74), is a major east–west U.S. highway across the northern part of the U.S. state of Alabama. West of Hamilton, SR 74 continues west to end at US 78 (unsigned SR 4), while US 278 turns south along US 43/SR 17/SR 171 to Guin, where it turns west along SR 118 to the Mississippi state line.

Route description

US 278 enters Alabama near Sulligent. After passing through the city, the route continues on a winding path until it reaches Guin, where it turns north and gains US 43. It then junctions with I-22/US 78. It eventually reaches Hamilton, where it junctions with SR 17 and turns off of US 43's right of way.

It continues on a curvy path until it reaches Natural Bridge, where it junctions with SR 5 and SR 13. It continues onward and enters the William B. Bankhead National Forest, where Double Springs lies. It junctions with SR 33 and SR 195. It continues onward, passing through Houston (AL). It then exits the National Forest and enters Addison, which is home to its junction with CR 41, which is a corridor connecting Jasper, Arley, Danville, and Decatur. It passes through much less hilly terrain and crosses the county line into Cullman County.

The route passes through slightly curvy terrain until its junction with I-65. It enters the city of Cullman and junctions with US 31 and SR 69. It continues east for about one mile from its second junction with SR 69 and junctions with SR 157. It continues east and eventually enters Holly Pond, which is home to its junction with SR 91. It continues onto Blount County.

It eventually junctions with US 231, which leads to SR 67 to the north and SR 79 south to the south in Cleveland. The main junction here is in Blountsville. The route continues through hilly terrain to SR 79 itself. It passes through hilly terrain to Snead, which is home to its junction with SR 75. It continues onward through hilly terrain to the county line to Etowah County.

The route is mostly hilly with three-lane stretches at points due to the steep uphills along the route, specifically eastbound. It reaches Altoona, where it junctions with SR 132. It continues to Ivalee, which is home to its junction with SR 179 and is also home to the Mountain Top Flea Market, among the biggest flea markets in the state. It almost immediately descends down a hill into Ridgeville, which is home to its junction with SR 77. It passes through a slight ridge cut and crosses a railroad line, where it junctions with Gallant Road at a fork and then junctions with US 431, which is a four-lane divided highway. The route joins US 431 into Attalla, which is home to its notable concurrency with US 11. US 278 and US 431 leave US 11, cross below a railroad track, and enter into Gadsden. It immediately junctions with I-59 and heads into town, where it junctions with SR 211, US 411, and George Wallace Drive, which leads to I-759. It leaves the city and finally splits off from US 431.

The route passes through Hokes Bluff on its way to Piedmont. In Piedmont, the route junctions SR 21. It then turns off of its right of way, the right-of-way becoming Nances Creek Indian Boulevard.

The route has no more major junctions at this point as it crosses through Cherokee County. It passes through highly hilly terrain and crosses into Cleburne County. It then crosses into Georgia at Esom Hill, Georgia, continuing on its way to Cedartown.

History

From its creation in 1955 to 1965, US-278 followed a very different route from Whitehouse to Double Springs. It followed SR-129 from Whitehouse to Haleyville; In Haleyville, the route followed SR-13 to SR-195. It would then follow SR-195 to Double Springs, where it would turn onto its present-day routing. Oddly, State Route 74 followed the present day routing between the two cities via Natural Bridge from 1956 onward.

The routing of U.S. Route 278 in between Double Springs and Cullman has witnessed several minor changes from 1955 to the present day. From its creation until at least 1985, the route followed present-day Winston County Roads 3800 and 3700, crossing Brushy Creek at a now-abandoned bridge before climbing up to join its present-day route into Addison. On the east side of Addison, the route followed Main Street, descending down and crossing Blevens Creek at another abandoned bridge before rejoining the modern-day route.  Both of these routings have been replaced with straighter routings. On the west side of Cullman, the route previously descended down into a hollow where it proceeded to cross Vest Creek before climbing up the hollow and rejoining the modern-day routing; this routing was replaced in 2012 with a much straighter bridge across the same creek.  Until at least 1997, the route followed 4th Street into Cullman, where it engaged in a short concurrency with U.S. Route 31 before rejoining the modern-day route; this was replaced with the modern-day routing along 3rd Street. 

During the 1960s–1980s, there were some different variations of the routing of US 278 through the cities of Gadsden and Attalla, however construction of four-lane segments on the western side of Gadsden and in Attalla allowed the highway to be placed on its current route which has been in place since the mid-1980s.

Until the mid-1980s, a US 278 Business (US 278 Bus.) existed in the city of Piedmont. US 278 is carried on a four-lane segment that bypasses the center of Piedmont. US 278 Bus. began where the four-lane segment began on the northeast side of Piedmont, then traveled southwest into the center of the city and intersected SR 9 and then traveled to the north, concurrent with SR 9 until it intersected the four-lane US 278 on the northern edge of the city.

Future

A four-laning project is ongoing east of Gadsden near the town of Hokes Bluff.

Major intersections

See also

References

78-2
 Alabama
Transportation in Lamar County, Alabama
Transportation in Marion County, Alabama
Transportation in Winston County, Alabama
Transportation in Cullman County, Alabama
Transportation in Blount County, Alabama
Transportation in Etowah County, Alabama
Transportation in Calhoun County, Alabama
Transportation in Cherokee County, Alabama
Transportation in Cleburne County, Alabama
Gadsden, Alabama